Pellasimnia brunneiterma is a species of sea snail, a marine gastropod mollusc in the family Ovulidae.

This species appears to be a cryptic species triad..

References

External links 
 Photo

Ovulidae
Gastropods described in 1969